Thomas Johnson  (27 February 1863 – 9 September 1954) was an English botanist and academic renowned as an expert and cataloguer of the world's algae, fungi, and fossil plants.

Biography
Johnson was born in  Barton-upon-Humber, Lincolnshire, in 1863. He attended Elmfield College in Heworth, York and, after additional study, received an appointment in 1890 as Professor of Botany at Ireland's largest institution of higher learning, Catholic University of Ireland which, in 1909, became University College Dublin. In his 36-year tenure in the post he instructed generations of future botanists and other scientists, oversaw the expansion of the National Herbarium and was instrumental in the founding of the first seed testing station for Britain and Ireland. He also supervised and conducted research on economic botany, served on committees charged with advancing scientific learning in Ireland and was a pioneer in the study of phytopathology, the scientific study of plant diseases.

He served as vice president of the Royal Irish Academy. He was made a Fellow of the Linnean Society of London in 1890.

In 1902, Matilda Cullen Knowles was appointed a temporary assistant in the then Botanical Section of the National Science and Art Museum. She worked closely with Johnson to continue the development of the Herbarium collection. She also co-authored with him the Hand List of Irish Flowering Plants and Ferns (1910).

Johnson retired in 1923, allowing Knowles to take over curatorship, despite 'Assistant Keeper' being her job title.

Personal life
Johnson married Bessie Stratton Rowe, daughter of Rev. W. Rowe of Toronto. They had two sons, Lt. Col. Reginald Johnson RAMC (1888–1941) and Capt. Thomas William Gerald Johnson   (1893–1976), and a daughter, Thirza Mary Patricia Johnson (1894–1955). His eldest son was a physician with the Royal Army Medical Corps and was killed in action in the Second World War, while his younger son was awarded the Military Cross during the First World War for bravery during the Gallipoli Campaign while serving with the 5th (Service) battalion of the Connaught Rangers.

Thomas Johnson died in 1954 in Dublin, and was interred at Deans Grange Cemetery.

References

External links
White, James (1996) History of Botany at UCD: 200th Anniversary of the establishment of the Professorship of Botany (Website of University College Dublin)
University College Dublin: Reference manual - Faculty of Science
 

1863 births
1954 deaths
People from Barton-upon-Humber
English botanists
Academics of University College Dublin
Fellows of the Linnean Society of London
Scientists from Dublin (city)
Burials at Deans Grange Cemetery
English emigrants to Ireland